The 2002 Nagoya Grampus Eight football season was as follows.

Competitions

Domestic results

J. League 1

Emperor's Cup

J. League Cup

Player statistics

Other pages
 J. League official site

Nagoya Grampus Eight
Nagoya Grampus seasons